

The John Wesley McElroy House is a historic house museum in Burnsville, Yancey County, North Carolina. The vernacular Federal-Greek Revival style house, which was built in the 1840s, is on the National Register of Historic Places.

History 
The  house was built by John Wesley McElroy as a mansion for his wife, Catherine. McElroy was a local businessman and lawyer, and a brigadier general in the Confederate Army. During the war, the house was used as a hospital and the headquarters for the home guard. In 1889 the house was purchased by William Moore, a state senator and former captain in the Union Army. Moore's family lived in the house until 1917 and it became the first Post Office in Burnsville. During the 1970s the house was abandoned and fell into disrepair.

The house was purchased in 1987 by the Yancey History Association. The Association restored the building, which was opened as the Rush Wray Museum of Yancey County History in 2003. The museum houses period furniture and exhibits on local history.

References

Sources 
Heritage of the Toe River Valley, Volume II, Lloyd Bailey - McElroy House, Michael C. Hardy

External links
NC ECHO - Rush Wray Museum of Yancey County History - includes photos

Houses on the National Register of Historic Places in North Carolina
Houses completed in 1845
Museums in Yancey County, North Carolina
Historic house museums in North Carolina
Federal architecture in North Carolina
Greek Revival houses in North Carolina
National Register of Historic Places in Yancey County, North Carolina
1845 establishments in North Carolina